Dog Pounded is a 1954 (© 1953) Warner Bros. Looney Tunes animated cartoon short directed by Friz Freleng. The short was released on January 2, 1954, and stars Tweety and Sylvester. The voices were performed by Mel Blanc. The title is a play on the phrase dog pound.

Similar in concept to Ain't She Tweet, this cartoon features Sylvester in pursuit of catching Tweety, with a gang of bulldogs (including Hector) as the obstacles. Dog Pounded also marks the only use of Pepé Le Pew in a Friz Freleng-directed short (and the second time Pepé Le Pew has appeared in a cartoon that was not directed by Chuck Jones or a member from Chuck Jones' unit—the first being Arthur Davis' Odor of the Day).

Plot
A destitute Sylvester rummages through trash in search of food. Nearly out of luck, the cat hears singing coming from atop a tall tree inside an enclosure, looks up and sees Tweety. Sylvester, eager for his supper, rushes inside the enclosure ... unaware that the enclosure is the city dog pound. Sylvester gets attacked and driven from the pound by an army of bulldogs, whose purpose in life seemingly is to protect Tweety from predators.

Wanting to get by the dogs, Sylvester employs the following tricks, all of them ending in failure:

Holding an umbrella for balance, the cat walks across a guide wire connecting a light pole and the tree. The dogs collectively blow a gust of doggie breath at their foe, causing Sylvester to lose his balance and fall into the waiting horde of dogs.
Digging a tunnel beneath the dog pound, to get at the tree unnoticed and snatch Tweety. The dogs, already having anticipated this latest scheme, have dug their own tunnel and wait for Sylvester to break through to their side. They attack Sylvester and chase him back to the tunnel entrance. Once he's all the way out of the tunnel, he closes it up with a shovel and forces the dogs back in.
A dog suit. The dogs startle their new "companion", causing the head to come loose, and Sylvester quickly tries to secure it before the dogs notice. However, either having already noticed or never being fooled from the start, the dogs reject Sylvester (as a fake dog) and force him to flee. The cat temporarily gets away, but the city dog catcher quickly returns him to his "home" (and a further beating).
Sylvester tries to climb over the fence, but the fence knocks him to the ground as a dog comes on the outside. The dog goes back in, flipping the fence frame back and revealing Sylvester having been clobbered.
Mass hypnotism, which momentarily evens the odds; by staring at the dogs, Sylvester is able to freeze and paralyze the dogs in place. Sylvester easily grabs Tweety, who panics and helplessly yells to his protectors to rescue him. When Sylvester blurts out the secret to un-freezing the dogs (a police whistle), Tweety instantly provides one and begins to blow ... except Sylvester quickly sees that coming and places a glass over Tweety. But Tweety fights back by poking Sylvester's palm with a needle ... and breaking the dogs out of their trance.
Entering an empty dog pound, Sylvester tries climbing the tree ... only to discover the dogs waiting on the branches.
Blasting himself off in a rocket. The rocket shoots without him and he is shown furless.
A swing, which Sylvester hopes will allow him to swing harmlessly above the dogs to the tree. However, the swing's reach is too low, and the dogs are able to get at Sylvester ... who never returns to the outside.

The final attempt nearly works: Painting a phony skunk stripe down his back to scare the dogs away. This plan proves to work too well: just as he grabs Tweety and makes his getaway, he is intercepted by Pepé Le Pew who mistakes Sylvester for a female skunk and tries to make love to him. While Sylvester tries to break free from Pepé's grasp, Tweety looks on and comments, "That puddy tat has turned into an awful stinker!" Pepé's high-pitched kissing sounds are heard just before the "That's all, Folks!" title card appears.

Reception
Animation writer Earl Kress writes, "By 1954 Tweety cartoons had become, if not exactly predictable, then at least formulaic. However, Dog Pounded is a very clever twist on the Tweety-Sylvester-Granny-Hector quadrangle."

References

External links

Nuance and Suggestion in the Tweety and Sylvester Series -  Written by Kevin McCorry

1954 animated films
Looney Tunes shorts
Short films directed by Friz Freleng
1950s Warner Bros. animated short films
Remakes of American films
Films scored by Carl Stalling
1954 short films
Animated films about cats
Animated films about birds
Animated films about dogs
Pepé Le Pew films
Tweety films
Sylvester the Cat films
1950s English-language films
American animated short films